Anthony Neyrot (in ; in ) (1425 in Rivoli, Piedmont – 10 April 1460) was an Italian Dominican priest, apostate, reconvert, and martyr.

A Dominican friar, Neyrot was captured by Tunisian corsairs while on his way from Sicily to Naples. A prisoner, before long he abjured his religion in exchange for better treatment. Some months later he learned of the death of his saintly mentor, Antoninus of Florence, which caused him to reconsider his actions. He was subsequently executed for renouncing Islam.

Life
Anthony Neyrot was born in Rivoli, in Piedmont, Italy, and entered the Dominicans. After completing his studies, he was ordained and lived for a while at San Marco in Florence where he studied under Antoninus of Florence. Unsatisfied, he asked for a mission change and he was sent to Sicily. Still unhappy, he left for Naples. On this voyage, his ship was captured by Moorish pirates, and along with the other passengers, was taken to North Africa.

It would appear that the Muslim caliph of Tunis favored Anthony, as he was treated kindly, and was not even confined, until his arrogance angered his captors. Antony was impatient and resented the idea of being a prisoner. Living on a diet of bread and water, he soon collapsed. He then denied his faith in order to buy his freedom.

Anthony lost all faith in Christianity and began to translate the Koran. He was adopted by the king and married a Turkish lady of high rank. Then came news of the death of Antoninus. This led to a radical change in Anthony's attitudes. He had a dream in which Antoninus appeared to him; the conversation that transpired caused Anthony to resolve to readopt the faith which he had left behind, although such an action would result in his certain death.

Finding a Dominican priest, Anthony confessed his sins, and on Palm Sunday of 1460, he publicly asked forgiveness from his fellow Catholics and was thereafter readmitted to his order.

Wanting his reconversion to be as public as his denial had been, Anthony waited until the king held a public procession. Having confessed and made his private reconciliation with God, Anthony mounted the palace steps where all could see him clothed in a Dominican habit. Anthony proclaimed his faith, and the outraged king ordered that he be stoned to death. Anthony was killed on Holy Thursday, 1460.

Veneration
Anthony's body was recovered at great expense by merchants from Genoa and was returned to Rivoli, where his tomb became a place of pilgrimage. Miracles were attributed to it, and an annual procession was held at his shrine, wherein all the present-day members of his family dressed in black and revered his memory.

Blessed Anthony's cultus was approved by Pope Clement XIII on 22 February 1767.

See also
 Saint Anthony Neyrot, patron saint archive

References

Further reading
 Cormier, O.P., Hyacinthe-Marie. Saints and Saintly Dominicans

1425 births
1460 deaths
People executed by stoning
People from Rivoli, Piedmont
Italian Dominicans
Italian beatified people
15th-century venerated Christians
Converts to Roman Catholicism from Islam